Xaitongmoin County or Zhetongmön is a county of Xigazê in the Tibet Autonomous Region.

History 

Ganden Lhading, which became a branch of Tashi Lhunpo Monastery, was founded in 1050. It converted to Gelug in 1650. Renga Chode, a Shangpa Kagyu Monastery, was also founded in 1050. It converted to Gelug in 1600.

Tashi Gepel was a minor 14th century Kagyu nunnery.

Takmo Lingka, a Sakya monastery, was founded here in 1436.

Dratsang Monastery (Zhe Dratsang, chazang si), founded in the 15th century, was a Nyingma or Sakya monastery. It also became a Gelug monastery in the 17th century.

Gonga Choding, a Nyingma monastery, was founded in 1500, and converted to Gelug in 1650.

A Gelug hermitage, Ngulchu Chodzong, was known for its printery.

The county was home to the 16th century main estate of the Thon Pa family.

Town and townships
 Chabkha Town 
 Tongmoin Township
 Rungma Township
 Tarding Township
 Danagpu Township
 Namoqê Township 
 Ringqênzê Township 
 Dagmoxar Township
 Mübaqêqên Township
 Qingtü Township
 Qêqung Township
 Nartang Township
 Tsozhi Township 
 Nyangra Township 
 Zêxong Township
 Chuzhig Township
 Capu Township 
 Danagda Township
 Lêba Township

Other settlement
 Dêlêg
 Rigyel Monastery, Bon monastery founded in 1360.

References

External links
 Xaitongmoin County Annals

Counties of Tibet
Shigatse